Neal Martin may refer to:
 Neal Martin (ice hockey)
 Neal Martin (wine critic)

See also
 Neil Martin (disambiguation)